Edoxudine (or edoxudin) is an antiviral drug. It is an analog of thymidine, a nucleoside.

It has shown effectiveness against herpes simplex virus.

Synthesis

Mercuration of the 2'-deoxyuridine 1 leads to the organometallic derivative 2; reaction of that with ethylene in the presence dilithiopalladium tetrachloride gives the alkylation product 3; this is reduced catalytically in situ. There is thus obtained the antiviral agent edoxudine 4.

References 

Pyrimidinediones